The rustic bunting (Emberiza rustica) is a passerine bird in the bunting family Emberizidae, a group now separated by most modern authors from the finches, Fringillidae. The genus name Emberiza is from Old German Embritz, a bunting. The specific rustica is Latin for "rustic, simple".

It breeds across the northern Palearctic. It is migratory, wintering in south-east Asia, Japan, Korea, and eastern China. It is a rare wanderer to western Europe.

It breeds in wet coniferous woodland. Four to six eggs are laid in a nest in a bush or on the ground. Its natural food consists of seeds, and when feeding young, insects.

This bird is similar in size to a reed bunting. It has white underparts with reddish flank, pink legs and a pink lower mandible. The summer male has a black head with a white throat and supercilium and a reddish breast band.

The female has a heavily streaked brown back and brown face with a whitish supercilium. She resembles a female reed bunting, but has the reddish flank streaks, a chestnut nape and a pink, not grey, lower mandible.

The call is a distinctive zit, and the song is a melancholic delee-deloo-delee.

References

External links 

 OBC 11 photographs (see pulldown menu at page bottom)

rustic bunting
Birds of Eurasia
Birds of Russia
rustic bunting